Maria Golubeva may refer to:

 Maria Golubeva (1861-1936): Russian revolutionary
 Marija Golubeva (b. 1973): Latvian politician and political scientist